Olchowo may refer to the following places:
Olchowo, Greater Poland Voivodeship (west-central Poland)
Olchowo, Warmian-Masurian Voivodeship (north Poland)
Olchowo, West Pomeranian Voivodeship (north-west Poland)